Bharat Ki Beti (India's Daughter) is a 1935 Hindi social film directed by Premankur Atorthy. The cast included  Rattan Bai, Gul Hamid, Yasmin, Amirbai Karnataki , Gope, Dadabhai Sarkari and Hari Shivdasani. The music direction was credited to Jhande Khan and Anil Biswas. This was actor Hari Shivdasani's second film, having begun his career with Dharma Ki Devi (1935) the same year. Produced by Eastern Arts, Bharat Ki Beti  focused on the nationalistic viewpoint while India was still under British rule.

Cast
Rattan Bai
Hamid
Miss Kamla
Yasmin
Amirbai Karnataki
Gope
Miss Saronini
Dadabhai Sarkari
Shivdasani

Soundtrack
The music of the film was composed by Ustad Jhande Khan.

The devotional song, "Tere Poojan Ko Bhagwaan Bana Man Mandir Alishan" sung by Rattan Bai in this film is still regarded as a classic bhajan.

Track listing

"Ishwar Ne Jab Prem Banaya"
"Shyam Sundar Ki Bansri Jag Mein Sukh Ka Geet Sunaati Hai"
"Sansaar Ke Sundar Roop Ka Lobhi"
"Aye Bhanwra Sanan Manan Sankari Maare"
"Hamari Kahi Maano Ae Babu Ji"
"Naina Neer Bhar Aaye Saanwre"
"Deen Dayal Daya Karke Anil Biswas"
"Dhoondat Kahan Jangal Jangal Jangal Man Mein Baawri"
"Prabhu Mori Naiyya Paar Karo"
"Pyari Tori Rangat Badi Mazedaar"
"Ghanshyam Bhaj Man Baarambaar"

References

External links

1935 films
1930s Hindi-language films
Films directed by Premankur Atorthy
Indian drama films
Indian black-and-white films
1935 drama films
Hindi-language drama films